Davis Mensah (born 2 August 1991) is an Italian football player of Ghanaian descent. He plays for  club Mantova.

Club career
He played 6 out of the first 7 seasons of his senior career in the fourth-tier Serie D.

He made his professional Lega Pro 2 debut for Virtus Verona on 1 September 2013 in a game against Bra.

On 1 July 2021, he signed a two-year contract with Serie B club Pordenone. He made his Serie B debut for Pordenone on 29 August 2021 against SPAL.

On 16 August 2022, Mensah moved to Mantova in Serie C.

References

External links
 

1991 births
Sportspeople from the Province of Verona
Footballers from Veneto
Italian people of Ghanaian descent
Living people
Italian footballers
Association football forwards
Virtus Verona players
U.S. Triestina Calcio 1918 players
Pordenone Calcio players
Mantova 1911 players
Serie D players
Serie C players
Serie B players